Abdul Amir al-Shammari is an Iraqi politician, currently serving as the Minister of the Interior. Al-Shammari was appointed to the role by Iraqi Prime Minister Mohammed Shia' Al Sudani as of 28 October 2022.

References

Year of birth missing (living people)
Living people
21st-century Iraqi politicians